Dashidaira Dam is a gravity dam located in Toyama prefecture in Japan. The dam is used for power production. The catchment area of the dam is 461.2 km2. The dam impounds about 35  ha of land when full and can store 9010 thousand cubic meters of water. The construction of the dam was started on 1980 and completed in 1985.

References

Dams in Toyama Prefecture
1985 establishments in Japan